Carex phaeocephala is a species of sedge known by the common name dunhead sedge.

Distribution
This sedge is native to much of western North America, from Alaska to California to New Mexico, where it grows from foothills to high elevation habitats, including areas of alpine climate, generally in rocky soils.

Description
Carex phaeocephala produces dense clumps of stems up to about 45 centimeters in maximum height with several narrow, channeled leaves up to about 20 centimeters long.

The dense or open inflorescence contains several spikes of flowers. Female flowers have scales which are greenish or brown-orange with narrow pale edges. The perigynium covering the fruit has a dark center and greenish margins.

External links
Jepson Manual Treatment – Carex phaeocephala
Flora of North America
Carex phaeocephala – Photo gallery

phaeocephala
Alpine flora
Flora of Western Canada
Flora of the Western United States
Flora of Alaska
Flora of the Sierra Nevada (United States)
Flora of California
Plants described in 1906
Flora without expected TNC conservation status